Belen Jesuit Preparatory School is a private, Catholic,  all-male, preparatory school run by the Antilles Province of the Society of Jesus in Tamiami, unincorporated Miami-Dade County, Florida, operated by the Society of Jesus. It was established in Havana, Cuba, by the Jesuits in 1854, but moved to the United States after the communist government of Fidel Castro, himself an alumnus, took power and expelled the Jesuits. It has since made the Cardinal Newman Society's honor roll. The name Belen is Spanish for "Bethlehem."

History

Havana Vieja, 1854-1925

In 1854, Queen Isabella II of Spain issued a royal charter founding the "Colegio de Belén" in Havana. The school took its name from the building it occupied at its founding, the former convent and convalescent hospital of Our Lady of Belen. Over time, the school expanded through the acquisition of several nearby buildings in Havana. The resulting complex became known as "El Palacio de Educación" (The Palace of Education). "El Palacio" now houses the Instituto Técnico Militar (Military Technical Institute).

A meteorological observatory was established in 1857. A facility was built in 1896. The education of students was assigned to the priests and brothers of the Society of Jesus (the Jesuits).

Marianao, 1925-1961.

The Collegio de Belen opened in Marianao in 1925, situated next door to the Tropicana Club, it was constructed on sixty acres of land that had been donated and was to be used as the main building of the Colegio de Belén, which had been opened since 1854 within the premises of the convent of the same name in Old Havana. Those premises had become unsuitable and badly located due to the change of atmosphere in the neighborhood and the growth of the city. The project was designed by the Cuban architectural firm of Morales & Cia (Leonardo Morales y Pedroso) in 1925 with an unlimited budget for designing a religious school, the Colegio de Belén, Havana.

The result was a monumental pan-optical edifice with an extensive neoclassical façade perpendicular to the chapel and four large courtyards, recalling the building in Havana Vieja, with three stories of porticoed galleries to link nine radial pavilions. The appearance is of extreme monumentality which is supported both in the design resources and the unusual dimensions of the spaces. The structure is built from concrete-covered steel, the flooring and roof are monolithic reinforced concrete.

1961

In 1961 the government of Fidel Castro (himself a graduate of Belen) confiscated all private and religious schools in Cuba. Castro expelled the Jesuits and declared the government of Cuba an atheist government. Castro's government nationalized businesses and banks, confiscating more than $1 billion in American-owned property. Thousands of those dubbed "enemies of the revolution" were executed or imprisoned, and the school curriculum was reshaped by communist doctrine. Free speech was not an option, and the Cuban socialist press was an extension of the government.

In the United States
In 1961, the revolutionary regime confiscated the school's property and expelled the Jesuit faculty. The school was re-established in Miami the same year on the fourth floor of the Gesu Elementary School. The building no longer exists and is now downtown Miami's  Gesu Church's parking lot. In 1962, a new building was acquired and the school moved to the new site on the corner of SW  8th Street and 7th Avenue.

Since 1981, Belen Jesuit sits on a 33-acre site in western Miami-Dade County. There are over 7,000 members of the Belen Alumni Association currently active.

Belen Jesuit is accredited by AdvanceED. The school is also affiliated with the National Catholic Educational Association and is a member of the Jesuit Schools Network and the Jesuit High School College Counselors Association.

Observatory
The Fr. Benito Viñes, S.J. Observatory for Astronomy and Meteorology was built with donations from the Belen Jesuit Class of 1972 and is named the Fr. Benito Viñes, SJ Observatory. The observatory has an array of 11 telescopes, and Belen is the only middle/high school in South Florida equipped with a 16" telescope with a charge-coupled device (digital) camera for astrophotography. Weather forecasts from the facility are radioed daily to various cities in Florida. The observatory has grown and made popular under Fr. Pedro Cartaya, S.J.

Aquatic center
The Gian Zumpano Aquatic Center was completed on June 6, 2018, and is the home to the Belen Jesuit swimming team. This Olympic size swimming facility was built in honor of Belen alumnus Gian Zumpano from the class of 1986. Gian, was the salutatorian of his class and died at the age of 22. During his time at Belen Jesuit and beyond, he inspired others through his humility and selflessness. The presence of his bust on the pool deck serves as a reminder of his spirit and dedication to teaching young children to swim. The cutting-edge competition complex is an architectural, acoustic and interpretive feat. It is the first known facility of its kind designed in the Jesuit tradition.

Financial assistance
Belen Jesuit Preparatory School makes financial assistance available to all students who attend the school regardless of race, color, creed, disability or national origin. The financial assistance program takes the form of hardship assistance. Hardship assistance is determined based on financial need subsequent to the evaluation of the financial assistance application. Belen Jesuit does not award academic or athletic scholarships.

The Belen financial assistance program is made possible by contributions of friends and family of Belen. The school's three signature events - Annual Gala, Father Izquierdo Memorial Golf Tournament, and the Annual Fr. Dorta- Duque, SJ Memorial Tombola help fund the financial assistance program.

Academics
The foundation of education at Belen Jesuit is based on religious formation, academic excellence, value education, social responsibility, and athletic achievement. The rigorous curriculum and graduation requirements are designed to ensure all students a chance for admission to the most demanding colleges and universities in the country. Academically, every Belen student has the opportunity to strive for the Magis by participating in a challenging college preparatory curriculum. Additionally, honors courses are offered as early as sixth grade. Advanced placement courses are offered starting in ninth grade, and dual enrollment courses are offered starting in tenth grade. All Belen Jesuit students have the potential to graduate with as many as 13 advanced placement courses (over 20 offered), 10 dual enrollment courses, and 35 honors classes offered in social studies, math, English, science, and Spanish.

Belen Jesuit has been named one of the top U.S. Catholic High Schools by the Newman Society and has also been ranked as a top all boys catholic school by Niche.

Student life
As a complement to strong academic rigor, student life is enriched by more than 45 scholastic clubs and 47 sports teams. Each student can explore particular interests and choose from an extensive array of options. Belen students have earned local, national and international recognition through their accomplishments in the band program, model United Nations, speech and debate, Mu Alpha Theta, robotics, chess clubs and various other clubs and honor societies.

The Ignatian Center for the Arts
The Ignatian Center for the Arts, inaugurated in October 2003, is the hub of the Humanities Department. The department includes the following academic areas: art, art history, drama, music, band, speech and debate and philosophy. Facilities include the 665-seat Ophelia & Juan Js. Roca Theater; the Olga & Carlos Saladrigas Art Gallery; the Leopoldo Nuñez Rehearsal Hall; seven classrooms and the theater's administrative office. The Saladrigas Gallery displays several professionally curated exhibits, which include an Archdiocesan high school young artists exhibit, a Belen community art show, and numerous other projects.

The Belen bands program has over 200 student musicians and was established in January 2005. There are three major band units in the school: the jazz band, the concert band and the drum line. The Belen jazz band has won first and second place awards in competitions at Disney World, the Miami-Dade Youth Fair and the Festival of Music in Washington D.C. and Chicago. The bands have three annual concerts at the Roca Theater, while the drum line is a source of "mood and spirit" at pep rallies and athletic competitions. Sections of the bands do charity work during the Christmas season, performing in malls, assisted living facilities, and hospitals.

Drama classes use the Roca Theater for their performances. Belen presents two high school productions annually and a one production annually from the middle school. Student productions include classics like Death of a Salesman, Fuenteovejuna, One Flew Over the Cuckoo's Nest, Godspell, A Few Good Men, West Side Story, Sound of Music, Little Shop of Horrors, Beauty and the Beast, The Outsiders, Moon Over Buffalo, Hunchback of Notre Dame and others. The Saladrigas Gallery, which is located adjacent to the theater, hosts both professional and student exhibits throughout the year.

Athletics

Belen Jesuit competes in basketball, bowling, crew, cross country, football, golf, lacrosse, soccer, swimming, tennis, track and field, volleyball, water polo, and wrestling. Typically over 900 athletes participate on 47 teams.

State championships https://www.belenjesuit.org/athletics/hall-of-champions:

•	Boys soccer: 2016, 2021, 2022

•	Boys crew: 2013

•	Boys water polo: 2009, 2015, 2016, 2022 

•	Boys cross country: 1995, 2006, 2007, 2008, 2010, 2011, 2012, 2013, 2017, 2018, 2019, 2020, 2021, 2022

•	Boys tennis: 2017

•	Boys track and field: 2007

•	Boys swimming and diving: 2006, 2007, 2008, 2009, 2010, 2012, 2013

•	Boys basketball: 2023

The Ramón Guiteras Memorial Library
The Ramón Guiteras Memorial Library is located on the campus and serves the student body and faculty of Belen as well as the local community. The library currently lists over 60,000 volumes, 95,000 ebooks, and dozens of subscriptions to electronic databases. The library staff includes one professional librarian and four assistants.

The library houses La Colección Cubana (The Cuban Collection), a special collection of Cuban books. La Colección Cubana consists of over 8,000 volumes, written either on the subject of Cuba or penned by Cubans and Cuban-Americans. La Colección Cubana is open to the public and is the second-largest collection of Cuban books and other media outside of Cuba

Core values
The following three Latin phrases are common mottos for the Society of Jesus and are reflected in the teachings of the school's curriculum and community service.

 Ad Maiorem Dei Gloriam (AMDG): to work as a community for the greater glory of God
 Magis: to strive to do more in sharing the Gospel values, learning, and serving
 Cura personalis: to care for the entire person

Notable alumni

See also
Arco de Belén, Havana
 List of Jesuit sites
 Colegio de Belén, Havana

References

Further reading

External links
Belen Jesuit Home Page

 

Boys' schools in the United States
Education in Miami
Jesuit high schools in the United States
Private high schools in Miami-Dade County, Florida
Private middle schools in Miami-Dade County, Florida
Roman Catholic Archdiocese of Miami
Catholic secondary schools in Florida
Educational institutions established in 1854
Schools with a royal charter
1961 establishments in Florida
1854 establishments in Cuba